Ramasamudram is a small town in Annamayya district of the Indian state of Andhra Pradesh. It is the mandal headquarters of Ramasamudram mandal.

Geography 

References

Villages in Annamayya district
Mandal headquarters in Annamayya district